Boris Khanukov, born 28 January 1939 in Kharkiv, is a Ukrainian-German chess player holding the title of International master.

In the first years 1980 he graduated in technical sciences at the Kharkiv Polytechnic Institute. Thereafter he studied at the Chess school of the Palace of Pioneers of Kharkiv, directed by Aleksandr Mazkjevič. In the years 1990 he was a chess instructor at the same school; one of his pupils was Artiom Tsepotan, who later became an International master.

In 1999 Khanukov emigrated to Germany, becoming a member of the German Chess Federation. He played at many Bundesliga championships with the team BSW Wuppertal.

He won the Kharkiv city championship in 1963 and the Kharkiv Oblast championship in 1969 (the latter ahead of Vladimir Savon). However, Khanukov achieved his best results in Senior championships. In 2002, at the European Senior Championship at Saint-Vincent, he shared  2nd-5th place with Mark Taimanov, Jānis Klovāns and Jacob Murey (Vladimir Bukal won the event). In the same year he won the German Senior Championship.

In 2008 he played at the 18th World Senior Championship in Bad Zwischenahn, placing 4th with 8.5/11 among 304 participants (Larry Kaufman won the event on tiebreak over Mihai Suba).

References

External links

Boris Khanukov games at 365Chess.com

Khanukov, Boris
Khanukov, Boris
Khanukov, Boris
Khanukov, Boris
Khanukov, Boris
Ukrainian emigrants to Germany